Kant Kishore Bhargava is an Indian diplomat who served as the second secretary-general of the South Asian Association for Regional Cooperation (SAARC) from October 17, 1989 to December 31, 1991. He emigrated to Canada in 1998.

References

Indian diplomats
Secretaries General of the South Asian Association for Regional Cooperation
Living people
Year of birth missing (living people)